Tari-Pori District is a district of the Hela Province of Papua New Guinea.  Its capital is Tari.  The population was 83,076 at the 2011 census.

References

Districts of Papua New Guinea
Hela Province